Cubase is a digital audio workstation (DAW) developed by Steinberg for music and MIDI recording, arranging and editing. The first version, which was originally only a MIDI sequencer and ran on the Atari ST computer, was released in 1989. Cut-down versions of Cubase are included with almost all Yamaha audio and MIDI hardware, as well as hardware from other manufacturers. These versions can be upgraded to a more advanced version at a discount.

Operation
Cubase can be used to edit and sequence audio signals coming from an external sound source and MIDI, and can host VST instruments and effects. It has a number of features designed to aid in composition, such as:
Chord Tracks: Helps the user keep track of chord changes, and can optionally be used to harmonize audio and MIDI tracks automatically, as well as trigger arpeggios and chords with basic voicings or voicings for piano and guitar. Chords can be either entered manually or detected automatically.
Expression Maps: Adds a lane to the Key Editor (Cubase's piano roll) that allows the user to define changes to the instrument's articulations and dynamics. In other DAWs, this requires the use of complicated MIDI program changes and key switches.
Note Expression: Allows MIDI controllers such as pitch bend, volume, pan, and filters to be applied only to the selected notes. This overcomes one of the limitations of MIDI, where such controllers normally affect the entire channel (For example, all notes of a chord are equally affected by a pitch bend message).
Key Editor Inspector: Provides precise control over chord drawing, chord inversions, quantization, transpositions, scale correction, note lengths, and legato. Changes can be applied either to only the selected notes or the entire MIDI part being edited.
Audio Warp Quantize: Create warp markers straight from hitpoints, both single audio loops as well as the entire arrangement can be non-destructively quantized.

MIDI parts can be edited using a piano roll, a dedicated drum editor, a score editor, or as a filterable complete list of MIDI events.

The user can also mix the various tracks down into a stereo .wav file ready to be burned to a compact disc (CD) in Red Book format, or .mp3 burned to CD or DVD as files, or to be published on the Web.

VST instruments
Cubase VST 3.7 in 1999 introduced a virtual instrument interface for software synthesizers known as VSTi. This made it possible for third-party software programmers to create and sell virtual instruments for Cubase. This technology has become a de facto standard for other DAW software, when integrating software based instruments on the Macintosh and Windows platforms. A new version of VST, VST3, was introduced with Steinberg's Cubase 4 which introduced improved handling of automation and audio output, native sidechaining, and many other features. Cubase 6 included VSTs such as HALion Sonic SE, Groove Agent ONE, LoopMash 2 and VST Amp Rack.

Editions
When Cubase 6 was released in 2011, Steinberg introduced 5 different editions for different levels of use. From highest to lowest they are: Cubase (now known as Cubase Pro), Cubase Artist, Cubase Elements, Cubase AI and Cubase LE. They have all been updated as new versions come out. While they all run on the same audio engine, the lower tiers have limits on the number of certain types of tracks. The number of audio tracks allowed in Cubase Pro is unlimited, Artist: 64, Elements: 48, AI: 32, LE: 16.

History
Cubase has existed in three main incarnations. Initially Cubase, which featured only MIDI, and which was available on the Atari ST, Macintosh and Windows.

After a brief period with audio integration, the next version, Cubase VST, featured fully integrated audio recording and mixing along with effects. It added Virtual Studio Technology (VST) support, a standard for audio plug-ins, which led to a plethora of third-party effects, both freeware and commercial. Cubase VST was only for Macintosh and Windows; Atari support had been effectively dropped by this time, despite such hardware still being a mainstay in many studios. Cubase VST was offering a tremendous amount of power to the home user, but computer hardware took some time to catch up. By the time it did, VST's audio editing ability was found to be lacking, when compared with competitors such as Pro Tools DAE and Digital Performer MAS.

To address this, a new version of the program, Cubase SX (based on Steinberg's flagship post-production software Nuendo) was introduced, which dramatically altered the way the program ran. This version required much relearning for users of older Cubase versions. However, once the new methods of working were learned, the improvements in handling of audio and automation made for a more professional sequencer and audio editor.

A notable improvement with the introduction of Cubase SX was the advanced audio editing, especially the ability to 'undo' audio edits. Early versions of Cubase VST did not have this ability. Cubase SX also featured real-time time-stretching and adjustment of audio tempo, much like Sonic Foundry's ground-breaking ACID.

In January 2003, Steinberg was acquired by Pinnacle Systems, within which it operated as an independent company before being sold to Yamaha Corporation in December, 2004.

In September 2006 Steinberg announced Cubase 4 - the successor to Cubase SX3. Notable new features include 'control room', a feature designed to help create monitor mixes, and a new set of VST3 plug-ins and instruments.

There are also lighter economic alternatives by Steinberg, originally named Cubasis, later becoming Cubase SE and then Cubase Essential at version 4. For its sixth generation, the program was renamed Cubase Elements 6. The name change was done presumably, because its rival Cakewalk had taken the Essential branding for its own entry-level DAW software, Sonar X1 Essential.

While the full version of Cubase features unlimited audio and MIDI tracks, lesser versions have limits. For instance, Cubase Elements 6 has a maximum of 48 audio track and 64 MIDI tracks and Cubase Artist 6 offer 64 audio and 128 MIDI tracks.

In 2013, Steinberg introduced Cubasis for iPad, a Cubase for iOS. This version was a full rewrite and supports MIDI and audio tracks, audiobus and virtual MIDI to work with external music apps from the first versions. In 2016, Cubasis 2 was released as a free update with new features such as real-time time-stretching, pitch-shifting for changing the key, a "channel strip" effects suite, and new plug-ins and sounds. In 2017, Steinberg received the MIPA (Musikmesse International Press Award) for Cubasis 2 in the Mobile Music App category at the Musikmesse in Frankfurt. In late 2019, Cubasis 3 followed as a new app and included group tracks, a "Master Strip" effects suite, a revamped MediaBay, more effects and many more features in addition to iPhone support. In mid-2020, Cubasis 3 was released for Android tablets and smartphones.

Notable users
	
Some notable users include:

Versions

See also

 Audio Stream Input/Output (ASIO)

References

External links
 

Atari ST software
MacOS audio editors
Digital audio workstation software
Music production software
Music software
Electronic music software